Pat Ha Man Jing (born 21 November 1965) is a Hong Kong actress. She has been called as the first generation of heroic women in Hong Kong

Early life 
On 21 November 1965, Ha was born in Hong Kong. Ha's native name is Man Jing.

Career 
Ha started acting in the 1982 film Nomad.
Ha was nominated as "Best Actress" at the 5th Hong Kong Film Awards (1986) for her role in My Name Ain't Suzie.
Ha retired in 1989.

Personal life 
Ha is married and has three daughters.

Filmography

References

External links
 
 HK Cinemagic entry

20th-century Hong Kong actresses
21st-century Hong Kong actresses
1965 births
Living people